The 1930 King's Birthday Honours in New Zealand, celebrating the official birthday of King George V, were appointments made by the King on the recommendation of the New Zealand government to various orders and honours to reward and highlight good works by New Zealanders. They were announced on 3 June 1930.

The recipients of honours are displayed here as they were styled before their new honour.

Knight Bachelor
 Alfred Seymour Bankart  – of Auckland; chairman of the Auckland War Memorial Committee. For public and charitable services.

Order of Saint Michael and Saint George

Knight Commander (KCMG)
 Thomas Mason Wilford  – high commissioner for New Zealand in London.

Companion (CMG)
 Robert Albert Anderson – of Invercargill. For public services.
 Paul Desiré Nestor Verschaffelt  – of Wellington; public service commissioner.

References

Birthday Honours
1930 awards
1930 in New Zealand
New Zealand awards